Gregory Alan Isakov (born October 19, 1979) is a South African-born singer-songwriter currently based in Boulder, Colorado. He and his family immigrated to the United States in 1986 and he was raised in Philadelphia, Pennsylvania.

Isakov's music combines indie and folk, featuring instruments such as the guitar and banjo. He is widely known for the songs "Words", "The Stable Song", "Big Black Car", "If I Go, I'm Goin" and "San Luis". Isakov has released seven albums, most recently Evening Machines in October 2018.

Life and career 
Isakov was born in Johannesburg on October 19, 1979. He immigrated with his family to the United States in 1986 during the apartheid era because his father Nissen started an electronic-engineering business in Philadelphia. His grandfather was a Lithuanian Jew who fled to South Africa during World War II.

In Philadelphia, he began touring with a band at the age of 16. Isakov later moved to Colorado to study horticulture at Naropa University. Isakov had played instruments his whole life, but began a life as a professional musician playing occasional gigs while also working as a gardener. His musical career became more serious when he began touring with Kelly Joe Phelps.

In 2003, Isakov self-released his first album Rust Colored Stones. In 2005, he self-released Songs for October. In 2007, he self-released That Sea, the Gambler. In 2009, Isakov self-released This Empty Northern Hemisphere which featured vocals by Brandi Carlile on five tracks and a cover of Leonard Cohen's "One of Us Cannot Be Wrong". In 2013, Isakov created his independent label Suitcase Town Music on which he released The Weatherman.

In 2016, Isakov released Gregory Alan Isakov with the Colorado Symphony, an album of eleven of his earlier songs orchestrated by several composers and recorded with the full Colorado Symphony. On October 5, 2018, he released Evening Machines on his Suitcase Town Music label.

Isakov has been influenced by the music of Leonard Cohen, Kelly Joe Phelps and Bruce Springsteen. He has played at many music festivals around the United States, Canada and Europe.

In November 2019, Isakov's album Evening Machines was nominated for the Grammy Award for Best Folk Album in the 62nd Annual Grammy Awards.

The song "Big Black Car" from the 2009 album This Empty Northern Hemisphere was featured in a 2012 McDonald's commercial. Isakov donated the proceeds to non-profit organizations that help further sustainable farming and nurture community.

Discography 

 Rust Colored Stones (2003)
 Songs for October (2005)
 That Sea, the Gambler (2007)
 This Empty Northern Hemisphere (2009)
 The Weatherman (2013)
 Gregory Alan Isakov with the Colorado Symphony (2016)
 Evening Machines (2018)

References

External links 

Folk Radio UK Session

Musicians from Colorado
American folk rock musicians
South African emigrants to the United States
Living people
1979 births
Musicians from Johannesburg
White South African people